Moss Vale High School is a government-funded co-educational comprehensive secondary day school, located in , a town in the Southern Highlands region of New South Wales, Australia.

Established in 1963, the school enrolled approximately 650 students in 2018, from Year 7 to Year 12; six percent identified as Indigenous Australians and six percent were from a language background other than English. The school is operated by the NSW Department of Education; the principal is Patrica Holmes, and deputy principals are Mathew Carlyon and Latitia Summers.

Overview 
The school's catchment area is drawn from the towns of Moss Vale, Bundanoon and Robertson; and the villages of Burrawang, Avoca, Wildes Meadow and Fitzroy Falls, Sutton Forest, Exeter, Penrose and Wingello, and surrounding rural areas.

Houses 

Moss Vale is divided into four houses, BELMORE (yellow), CARRINGTON (red), GIBRALTAR (blue), MORTON (green). These houses complete against one another during in-house athletics and swimming carnivals.

Principals 

 Robert McKenzie: 1974–1980
 Ron Watkins: 1981–1990
 Phillip Crampton: 1991–2001
 James McAlpine: 2001–2008
 Suzanne Williams: 2008–2012
 Peter Macbeth: 2013–2015
 Patricia Holmes: 2016–present

Subjects 

Moss Vale High School offers a large range of subjects. It specialises in agriculture and as the school has close links with the Moss Vale Institute of TAFE, with many subjects offered as vocational education and training courses, including metalwork and food technology. The school is also known for its extensive creative and performing arts. The school puts on term “CAPA”(creative and performing arts) concerts which showcase the schools amazing music, drama and art students.

Notable alumni

 Darren Beadmanhorse racing jockey
 Nathan Hindmarshrugby league player
 Ian Hindmarshrugby league player

See also 

 List of government schools in New South Wales
 Education in Australia

References

External links 
 
 NSW Schools website

Public high schools in New South Wales
1963 establishments in Australia
Educational institutions established in 1963
Moss Vale, New South Wales